"Witchcraft" is a popular song from 1957 composed by Cy Coleman with lyrics by Carolyn Leigh.

Versions
Frank Sinatra recorded "Witchcraft" three times in a studio setting. The first recording was in 1957, for his single release, and was later released on his compilation album All the Way (1961). Sinatra re-recorded "Witchcraft" for 1963's Sinatra's Sinatra, and finally recorded it as a duet with Anita Baker for Duets (1993).

Chart performance
"Witchcraft" was released in the U.S. in 1957 as a single by Frank Sinatra. At its highest ranking it reached number six on the Hot 100 chart and stayed on the charts for sixteen weeks.

Other recordings
"Witchcraft" has been recorded by many other artists, including Chris Connor, as the title track of her 1959 album, Sarah Vaughan, on her 1962 album You're Mine You, Ella Fitzgerald, on Ella Returns to Berlin (1961), and Bill Evans on Portrait in Jazz (1959). Bing Crosby recorded the song in 1958 for use on his radio show and it was subsequently included in the CD Bing Sings the Sinatra Songbook (2011). Another version by Joe Malone was featured in the 1993 movie Hocus Pocus. Siouxsie Sioux performed it in concert with her second band The Creatures and a brass section in 1998: it was then included on their live cd, Zulu. Robert Smith of The Cure recorded a version of the song for Tim Burton's Frankenweenie Unleashed!, a 14-track collection of songs "inspired by" the filmmaker's stop-motion creation Frankenweenie, released on 25 September 2012. Anthony Strong released a version of the song on his 2013 album Stepping Out.

Awards

Grammys
At the 1st Grammy Awards, Frank Sinatra was nominated for six Grammy awards, with Sinatra's recording of "Witchcraft" being nominated for the Record of the Year, Song of the Year, Best Male Pop Vocal Performance, and Nelson Riddle's arrangement nominated for the Grammy Award for Best Arrangement. Sinatra had two albums nominated for the Grammy Award for Album of the Year, and won the Grammy Award for Best Recording Package.

This song was also sung live by Peggy Lee.

Popular culture
Elvis Presley sang this song in The Frank Sinatra Timex Show: Welcome Home Elvis.
 A portion of the Frank Sinatra rendition is played during the climax of the film Who Framed Roger Rabbit and is included in the soundtrack for the film Fifty Shades of Grey and the 2005 film of Bewitched.
 A portion of the Frank Sinatra rendition is sang by Nick Bakay on Sabrina, The Teenage Witch in his voice role as warlock-turned-black cat Salem Saberhagen, before his character hacks up a hairball.

References

Frank Sinatra songs
Halloween songs
Songs with music by Cy Coleman
Songs with lyrics by Carolyn Leigh
1957 songs
Elvis Presley songs